A boar spear is a spear used for boar hunting.  It is relatively short and heavy and has two "lugs" or "wings" on the spearsocket behind the blade, which act as a barrier to prevent the spear from penetrating too deeply into the quarry where it might get stuck or break, and to stop an injured and furious boar from working its way up the shaft of the spear to attack the hunter.

See also
Bear spear
Bohemian earspoon
Ahlspiess

References

External links

Sunrise River Custom Knives—Jim Casselman's account of a boar hunt with spears.

Spears
Hunting equipment
Boar hunting